US Sénart-Moissy is a French football club based in Moissy-Cramayel, France.

History 
It was founded on 24 September 1932 and play at the Stade André Trémet, which has a capacity of 2,500. The color of the club is blue.

Notable former players

  Ted Kelton Agasson
  Papy Djilobodji
  Adrien Hunou
  Chris Mavinga
  Granddi Ngoyi
  Mickaël Tavares
  Kingsley Coman

Honours 
 Division d'Honneur Paris: 1996
 Championnat de France Amateur 2 Group B: 2002

References 

Sénart-Moissy
Association football clubs established in 1932
1932 establishments in France
Sénart-Moissy
Sénart-Moissy